The 2017 British Figure Skating Championships were held from 29 November–4 December, 2016 in Sheffield. Medals were awarded in the disciplines of men's singles, ladies' singles, pair skating, and ice dance at the senior, junior, and novice levels. The results were among the criteria used to determine international assignments.

Medallists

Senior

Junior

Senior results

Men

Ladies

Pairs

Ice dance

International team selections

World Championships
The 2017 World Figure Skating Championships were held in Helsinki, Finland from 27 March–2 April 2017.

European Championships
The 2017 European Figure Skating Championships were held in Ostrava, Czech Republic from 25 to 29 January 2017.

World Junior Championships
The 2017 World Junior Figure Skating Championships were held in Taipei City, Taiwan from 15 to 19 March 2017.

References

External links
 2017 British Championships results

British Figure Skating Championships, 2017
British Figure Skating Championships
Figure Skating Championships